Woodville is a rural suburb in the Hunter Region of New South Wales, Australia that is shared between the Port Stephens and Maitland local government areas (LGA).

Land use
Woodville's primary land use is agricultural, although housing and small-acre rural residential lots are increasingly significant. Its agriculture consists mainly of broad-acre hay production, along with beef cattle grazing, turf-farming, poultry and olive production. It sits on the floodplains of the lower Hunter River and is subject to periodic flooding.

Township
The suburb's centre consists of only a few buildings: an old timber shop, a few houses of mixed age and design and the All Saints sandstone gothic style church. The church is now privately owned and although no longer used for religious services, the heritage listed chapel is non-denominational and available for weddings both civil and religious while the timber hall associated with the church is now a function centre.

History
The Woodville region was occupied originally by Aboriginals, most likely the Worimi people. It offered abundant natural resources, with rivers, extensive wetlands, lakes, open woodland and rainforest.  In the early 19th century, the first Europeans known to enter the region were timber-getters seeking to exploit the extensive red cedar trees that grew on and near the banks of the Paterson and Hunter rivers.  Felled trees were floated down-river to timber mills in Newcastle.

Woodville has some significant historical buildings, such as Dunmore House, the Woodville shop/general store is Australia's oldest continually running business still carrying on the same services it was licensed for in 1844. The homestead of the historical property Stradbroke, which is listed in the Australian Heritage Database. Increasingly, traditional farms are being subdivided for semi-rural small holdings.

The Woodville School of Arts dates to 1877. The Gothic Revival All Saints Church is heritage listed and was officially opened in 1864, it features impressive arched and leadlight windows following its restoration work in 1922, the Hall associated with the church was constructed in the 1890s and is of architectural interest. Iona School dates to 1918.
Weddings and receptions are regularly held on the site which is unique in the region.

Woodville was also the name of a suburb in Sydney, causing confusion until the name of Woodville in Sydney was transposed to the new name of Villawood.

Dunmore Bridge
The heritage-listed Dunmore Bridge over the Paterson River is a wooden Allan truss lift-span bridge that was built in 1899. The lift-span is intact although now inoperative.

Image gallery

Notes

References

External links

 

Suburbs of Maitland, New South Wales
Suburbs of Port Stephens Council